Radula demissa is a species of liverwort.

Distribution
The species is found in Australia and New Zealand.

References

Porellales
Plants described in 2013
Terrestrial biota of New Zealand